In mathematics, a Grothendieck category is a certain kind of abelian category, introduced in Alexander Grothendieck's Tôhoku paper of 1957 in order to develop the machinery of homological algebra for modules and for sheaves in a unified manner. The theory of these categories was further developed in Pierre Gabriel's seminal thesis in 1962.

This example gives rise to one approach to noncommutative algebraic geometry: the study of "non-commutative varieties" is then nothing but the study of (certain) Grothendieck categories.

Definition
By definition, a Grothendieck category  is an AB5 category with a generator. Spelled out, this means that
  is an abelian category;
(Direct limits are always right-exact; the important point here is that we require them to be left-exact as well.)

The name "Grothendieck category" neither appeared in Grothendieck's Tôhoku paper nor in Gabriel's thesis; it came into use in the second half of the 1960s in the work of several authors, including Jan-Erik Roos, Bo Stenström, Ulrich Oberst, and Bodo Pareigis. (Some authors use a different definition in that they don't require the existence of a generator.)

Examples
 The prototypical example of a Grothendieck category is the category of abelian groups; the abelian group  of integers can serve as a generator.
 Given a ringed space , the category of sheaves of OX-modules is a Grothendieck category.
 Given a small site (C, J) (i.e. a small category C together with a Grothendieck topology J), the category of all sheaves of abelian groups on the site is a Grothendieck category.

Constructing further Grothendieck categories 

 Any category that's equivalent to a Grothendieck category is itself a Grothendieck category.
 Given Grothendieck categories  , the product category   is a Grothendieck category.

Properties and theorems
Every Grothendieck category contains an injective cogenerator. For example, an injective cogenerator of the category of abelian groups is the quotient group .

(Note that not all Grothendieck categories allow projective resolutions for all objects; examples are categories of sheaves of abelian groups on many topological spaces, such as on the space of real numbers.)

Grothendieck categories are well-powered (sometimes called locally small, although that term is also used for a different concept), i.e. the collection of subobjects of any given object forms a set (rather than a proper class).

Coproducts in a Grothendieck category are exact (i.e. the coproduct of a family of short exact sequences is again a short exact sequence), but products need not be exact.

A functor  from a Grothendieck category  to an arbitrary category  has a left adjoint if and only if it commutes with all limits, and it has a right adjoint if and only if it commutes with all colimits. This follows from Peter J. Freyd's special adjoint functor theorem and its dual.

As a consequence of Gabriel–Popescu, one can show that every Grothendieck category is locally presentable.

Every small abelian category  can be embedded in a Grothendieck category, in the following fashion.

Special kinds of objects and Grothendieck categories 
(In the case  of module categories, this notion is equivalent to the familiar notion of finitely generated modules.) Epimorphic images of finitely generated objects are again finitely generated. A Grothendieck category need not contain any non-zero finitely generated objects. 

A Grothendieck category is called locally finitely generated if it has a set of finitely generated generators (i.e. if there exists a family  of finitely generated objects such that to every object  there exist  and a non-zero morphism ; equivalently:  is epimorphic image of a direct sum of copies of the ). In such a category, every object is the sum of its finitely generated subobjects. Every category  is locally finitely generated.

An object  in a Grothendieck category is called finitely presented if it is finitely generated and if every epimorphism  with finitely generated domain  has a finitely generated kernel. Again, this generalizes the notion of finitely presented modules.

An object  in a Grothendieck category  is called coherent if it is finitely presented and if each of its finitely generated subobjects is also finitely presented. (This generalizes the notion of coherent sheaves on a ringed space.)

An object  in a Grothendieck category is called Noetherian if the set of its subobjects satisfies the ascending chain condition, i.e. if every sequence  of subobjects of  eventually becomes stationary. This is the case if and only if every subobject of X is finitely generated. (In the case , this notion is equivalent to the familiar notion of Noetherian modules.) A Grothendieck category is called locally Noetherian if it has a set of Noetherian generators; an example is the category of left modules over a left-Noetherian ring.

Notes

References

External links

Abelian Categories, notes by Daniel Murfet. Section 2.3 covers Grothendieck categories.  

Category theory
Additive categories
Homological algebra